The following is a collection of data for places with unusual or otherwise notable demographic characteristics within the United States. The data was obtained by the U.S. Census Bureau.

Of any population 

Note: Data for places with extremely small populations may be misleading or anomalous.

Tenure 

 Most populous place where the entire population owns their housing units. Fort Devens, Massachusetts. Population: 1,017.
 Most populous place where the entire population rents their housing units. K. I. Sawyer AFB, Michigan. Population: 1,443.

Income and housing costs 

 Highest per capita income and median housing cost below $100,000. Naples, South Dakota. Per capita income: $78,450; median housing cost: $36,300; population: 25.
 Highest per capita income and median housing cost below $200,000. Rex, North Carolina. Per capita income: $148,073; median housing cost: $137,500; population: 55.
 Highest median household income and median housing cost below $100,000. Valley Park, Oklahoma. Median household income: $101,376; median housing cost: $27,500; population: 24.
 Highest median household income and median housing cost below $200,000. Rex, North Carolina. Median household income: above $200,000; median housing cost: $137,500; population: 55.
 Lowest per capita income and median housing cost in excess of $1,000,000. Kirkwood, California. Per capita income: $14,853; population: 96.
 Lowest median household income and median housing cost in excess of $1,000,000. Mountain Village, Colorado. Median household income: $30,663; population: 978.

Income and race 

 Highest median household income and an entirely European American population. The following places had an entirely European American population and a median household income above $200,000:
 Mound, Louisiana. Population: 12.
 Orchid, Florida. Population: 140.
 Highest median household income and a proportion of African Americans in excess of 50 percent. Woodmore, Maryland. Percent African American: 64.9%; median household income: $97,270; population: 6,077.
 Highest median household income and a proportion of Asian Americans in excess of 50 percent. Milpitas, California. Percent Asian: 51.8%; median household income: $84,429; population: 62,698.
 Highest median household income and a proportion of Native Hawaiians or other Pacific Islanders in excess of 20 percent. Waimanalo Beach, Hawaii. Percent Native Hawaiian or other Pacific Islander: 47.3%; median household income: $55,781; population: 4,271.
 Highest median household income and a proportion of Native Americans in excess of 50 percent. Lotsee, Oklahoma. Percent Native American: 72.7%; median household income: $152,338; population: 11.

Race 

 Highest percentage of African Americans. All inhabitants are African American in the following places:
 McMullen, Alabama. Population: 66.
 Birdsong, Arkansas. Population: 40.
 Highest percentage of Asians. Kaumakani, Hawaii. Percent Asian: 76.1; population: 607.
 Highest percentage of Native Hawaiians or other Pacific Islanders. Anahola, Hawaii. Percent Native Hawaiian or other Pacific Islander:  47.8%; population: 1,932.
 Highest percentage of Native Americans. All inhabitants are Native Americans in the following places:
 Birch Creek, Alaska. Population: 28.
 New Allakaket, Alaska. Population: 36.
 Pinehill, New Mexico. Population: 116.
 Winslow West, Arizona. Population: 131.
 Spring Creek, South Dakota. Population: 136.
 La Plant, South Dakota. Population: 150.

Population in excess of 10,000

Income and housing costs 

 Highest per capita income and median housing cost below $100,000. Greater Sun Center, Florida. Per capita income: $28,222; median housing cost: $93,100; population: 16,321.
 Highest median household income and median housing cost below $100,000. The Colony, Texas. Median household income: $64,080; median housing cost: $26,661; population: 26,531.
 Lowest median household income and median housing cost in excess of $1,000,000. Beverly Hills, California. Median household income: $70,945; population: 33,784.

Race 

 Highest percentage of African Americans: East St. Louis, Illinois. Percent African American: 97.7; population: 31,542.
 Highest percentage of Asians: Waipahu, Hawaii. Percent Asian: 65.4; population: 33,108.
 Highest percentage of Whites: Kiryas Joel, New York. Percent White: 99.8; population: 13,138.
 Highest percentage of Hispanics or Latinos: San Benito, Texas. Percent Hispanic or Latino: 88.9; population: 25,500.

Population in excess of 50,000

Income 

 Highest median household income. Cupertino, California. Median household income: $100,411; population: 50,546.
 Highest per capita income and median housing cost below $100,000. Huntsville, Alabama. Per capita income: $24,015; median housing cost: $97,300; population: 158,216.
 Highest median household income and median housing cost below $100,000. Broken Arrow, Oklahoma. Median household income: $53,507; median housing cost: $99,000; population: 74,859.

Race 

 Highest percentage of African Americans: Gary, Indiana. Percent African American: 84.0; population: 102,746.
 Highest percentage of Asians: Monterey Park, California. Percent Asian: 61.8; population: 60,051.
 Highest percentage of Whites: Mentor, Ohio. Percent White: 97.3; population: 50,278.
 Highest percentage of Hispanics or Latinos: Harlingen, Texas. Percent Hispanic or Latino: 85.5; population: 51,500.

Income and race 
 Only large county where the median household income of African American households exceeds that of white households. Queens, New York City. Percent African American: 20%; median household income among blacks; $51,836. Percent white: 44%; median household income among whites; $50,960.

Population in excess of 200,000 
 Highest median household income. Plano, Texas. Median household income: $78,722; population: 222,030.

Race 

 Highest percentage of African Americans: Detroit, Michigan. Percent African American: 81.6; population: 951,270.
 Highest percentage of Asians: Honolulu, Hawaii. Percent Asian: 55.8; population: 371,657.
 Highest percentage of Whites: Scottsdale, Arizona. Percent White: 92.1; population: 202,705.
 Highest percentage of Hispanics or Latinos: Laredo, Texas. Percent Hispanic or Latino: 95.6; population: 236,091. (2010)

See also 

 Demographics of the United States

References

Demographics of the United States